Rodgers + Hammerstein's Cinderella is a musical in two acts with music by Richard Rodgers, lyrics by Oscar Hammerstein II, and a book by Douglas Carter Beane based partly on Hammerstein's 1957 book. The story is derived from  the fairy tale Cinderella, particularly the French version Cendrillon ou la petite pantoufle de verre, by Charles Perrault. The story concerns a young woman forced into a life of servitude by her cruel stepmother. She dreams of a better life, and with the help of her Fairy Godmother, Cinderella is transformed into an elegant young lady and is able to attend the ball to meet her Prince. In this version, however, she opens the Prince's eyes to the injustice in his kingdom.

Rodgers and Hammerstein originally wrote the songs for a 1957 television broadcast starring Julie Andrews, and it was remade twice for television and adapted for the stage in various versions prior to the Broadway production. The 2013 adaptation was the first version of Cinderella with the Rodgers and Hammerstein score mounted on Broadway. The new book by Beane introduces several new characters and a sympathetic stepsister, and the score features several additional Rodgers and Hammerstein songs. The production originally starred Laura Osnes in the title role and Santino Fontana as the Prince and ran for 770 performances. It was nominated for nine Tony Awards, winning one, for Best Costume Design. US national tours and international productions followed.

Background

The original 1957 broadcast starred Julie Andrews as Cinderella and Jon Cypher as the Prince. More than 107 million viewers saw the broadcast. The musical was staged at the London Coliseum in 1958 in a holiday pantomime adaptation that also used songs from Me & Juliet. Rodgers and Hammerstein signed with CBS. Stage versions began to appear in U.S. theatres by 1961.

After the musical's success in its initial broadcast and as a stage production, and since the original TV version had not been filmed for rebroadcast, CBS mounted another production in 1965 with a new script that hewed closer to the traditional tale, and nearly all of the original songs. Lesley Ann Warren played the title role. The New York City Opera produced the musical in 1993 and revived it several times. A United States tour played from 2000 to 2001, stopping at The Theatre at Madison Square Garden. A 1997 television re-make, adapted by Robert L. Freedman and directed by Robert Iscove, was  choreographed by Rob Marshall. Its racially diverse cast featured Brandy as Cinderella, Whitney Houston as her fairy godmother, Bernadette Peters as her stepmother, and Paolo Montalbán as the Prince. Several songs were added. A 30-week Asian tour starred Lea Salonga, beginning in 2008, and an all-female production of the musical in Japan in 2008 featured J-Pop group Morning Musume and veteran members of the Takarazuka Revue.

In Douglas Carter Beane's version of the story, Cinderella opens Prince Topher's eyes to the injustice in the kingdom. The Prince's parents have died, leaving the kingdom in the hands of a villainous prime minister, who has been the Prince's mentor and has duped his young charge into approving oppressive legislation. The rebel Jean-Michel, a new character, and stepsister Gabrielle are in love, and the two seek to overthrow the government. The score includes the best-known songs from the original version and features four songs from the Rodgers and Hammerstein catalogue, including "Now Is the Time", cut from South Pacific. The show was given workshop productions in 2012.

Productions
The musical's first Broadway production began previews on January 25, 2013 and opened on March 3, 2013 at The Broadway Theatre. Mark Brokaw directed the production, with Josh Rhodes choreographing, and the original cast included Laura Osnes in the title role, Santino Fontana as the Prince, Victoria Clark as Crazy Marie/the Fairy Godmother, Harriet Harris as Ella's stepmother, Peter Bartlett as Sebastian, The Prime Minister, Ann Harada and Marla Mindelle as stepsisters Charlotte and Gabrielle, and Greg Hildreth as the rebel Jean-Michel. Designers included Anna Louizos (sets), William Ivey Long (costumes), and Kenneth Posner (lighting). The show's initial reviews were mixed. 

Rebecca Luker replaced Clark from September 2013 to January 2014. Carly Rae Jepsen and Fran Drescher were replacements for Ella and the Stepmother, both making their Broadway debuts, from February 2014 to June 2014. Paige Faure stepped into the role of Ella, and Nancy Opel played the Stepmother, from June through September 2014. Keke Palmer, Sherri Shepherd, and Judy Kaye joined the cast as Ella, the Stepmother, and the Fairy Godmother in September 2014. A report in The Guardian commented, regarding Palmer, that "casting an African American actor as such an iconic – and typically pale – character is emblematic of the progress Broadway is making, slowly and haltingly, in employing actors of color in a broader array of parts." On September 23, 2014, Lesley Ann Warren joined the cast during the curtain call to celebrate the 50th-anniversary release of her 1965 television version. NeNe Leakes replaced Shepherd from November 2014. The production closed on January 3, 2015, after 41 previews and 770 regular performances.

A US national tour began on October 10, 2014, in Providence, Rhode Island, and closed in May 2016. Faure starred as Ella opposite Andy Jones as Topher. Fran Drescher reprised the role of the Stepmother during the tour's engagement in Los Angeles in March and April 2015. The tour recouped its investment after six months. A non-Equity US national tour began on September 27, 2016, in Grand Rapids, Michigan. It was directed by Gina Rattan and choreographed by Lee Wilkins.

A touring production in Australia began at the Regent Theatre, Melbourne, in May 2022, moved to the Lyric Theatre, Brisbane, in August, and opened at the Sydney Lyric theatre in October 2022; it closed on 29 January 2023. The cast includes Shubshri Kandiah as Ella; Ainsley Melham as Prince Topher; Silvie Paladino as Marie; Tina Bursill as Madame, and Todd McKenney as Sebastian. Nicholas Hammond took over the role of Sebastian for the musical's engagements in Brisbane and Sydney.

The musical was revived at Hope Mill Theatre in Manchester, England, for a limited run from November 1 through December 11, 2022, with an opening night on November 6. Grace Mouat starred as Ella, with Jacob Fowler as Prince Topher, Annie Aitken as Madame, Julie Yammanee as Marie/Godmother, Lee Ormsby as Sebastian, Matthew McDonald as Lord Pinkleton, Katie Ramshaw as Charlotte, Olivia-Faith Kamau as Gabrielle, and Adam Filipe as Jean-Michel.

Plot

Act I
A young woman named Ella lives with her stepmother and stepsisters, who treat her like a servant girl ever since the death of her late father.  Because she sits by the fireplace and is dirty from the cinders, they call her "Cinderella".  Ella dreams of a better life ("Prologue").

The prince of the kingdom is named Topher (short for Christopher); his parents have died, and he is advised by Lord Chancellor Sebastian. Though an expert at slaying dragons, griffins, gargoyles and giants, he feels uncertain about how he will rule as king when the time comes ("Me, Who Am I?").  Prince Topher and Ella meet as he is on his way to the palace.  She offers him a drink of water, and they share a moment before he departs. Ella then speaks with two of her friends: Jean-Michel, an erstwhile revolutionary, and Crazy Marie, a woman who lives at the edge of the forest and gathers what others throw away. Soon arrive Ella's stepmother Madame and stepsisters, the demanding Charlotte and the meek Gabrielle.  After they go inside, Ella again reflects on her dreams of a better life ("In My Own Little Corner").

In the palace, Sebastian and his henchman, Lord Pinkleton, persuade the Prince it is time for a Royal Wedding; a big ball will be held to find the bride. Pinkleton goes to the town square to make the announcement and finds Jean-Michel rallying the townsfolk to raise their voices in protest of the government's policies ("The Prince is Giving a Ball" / "Now Is the Time").

Madame's cottage is a whirl of activity as the stepmother and stepsisters prepare for the ball. They leave Ella behind, but Jean-Michel arrives to argue that Prince Topher needs to know more about the people of his kingdom. He teases Ella that she should put on a pretty gown and tell Topher that times are about to change.  Crazy Marie jokes with Ella about how life could be better ("In My Own Little Corner" (reprise) / "Fol-De-Rol"). Marie reveals herself to be Ella's Fairy Godmother and transforms a pumpkin and animals into a carriage with a footman and a driver; she turns Ella's rags into a beautiful gown ("Impossible"). She sends Ella to the ball with one caveat – the magic will expire at the stroke of midnight ("It's Possible").

The ball features magnificent dancing ("Gavotte"). Ella enters in her white ballgown, but no one recognizes her.  Her kindness and sense of fairness fascinate Prince Topher, and their song becomes a grand waltz ("Ten Minutes Ago" / "Waltz for a Ball").  Too soon, the clock begins to strike midnight. Ella had just enough time to tell the Prince that all is not well in his domain. She races down the stairs and trips, losing a shoe, but she quickly retrieves it and dashes off.

Act II
The Prince is determined to find the mysterious woman who spoke so honestly about the kingdom. The women of the court, led by stepsister Charlotte, bemoan that the Prince had not chosen any of them to be his love ("Stepsister's Lament"). A wild chase ensues, and the prince and his guards search high and low; they almost catch Ella ("The Pursuit").

Once again dressed in rags, Ella returns to the cottage and remembers how wonderful the Prince was ("He was Tall"). Madame, Charlotte and Gabrielle soon return in state of dejection. Ella tells them what she "imagines" the night at the palace must have been like ("When You're Driving Through the Moonlight"), including dancing with the Prince ("A Lovely Night"). Madame and her daughters and stepdaughter have a moment of shared emotion, for once. Soon, shy Gabrielle and Ella are left alone, and Gabrielle realizes that Ella was the woman at the ball. Gabrielle reveals herself to be not only an ally, but also in love with Jean-Michel, the firebrand. They vow to keep their secrets ("A Lovely Night" (reprise)).

Prince Topher continues his search ("Loneliness of Evening"), gradually realizing that Sebastian had been leading him down the wrong path. Topher decides to hold a second event to find the woman of truth. The night of the banquet arrives, and Gabrielle gives Ella her dress to attend the feast. Jean-Michel arrives at the house and confesses his love to Gabrielle. However, Madame catches them and also sees Ella in Gabrielle's dress. She tears the gown to shreds and kicks Gabrielle and Jean-Michel out of the house, telling them never to return. Madame then takes Charlotte to the banquet. In the nick of time, the Fairy Godmother produces perfect attire and helps Ella build her confidence for another frank talk with the Prince ("There is Music in You").

At the palace, Ella tells the prince how he could be a great king, and he immediately announces an election for Prime Minister between Jean-Michel and Sebastian. Topher is now ready to be a leader and knows the partner he needs in love and life ("Do I Love You Because You're Beautiful"). Suddenly, the clock begins to chime midnight. Ella races down the stairs but pauses and purposely leaves a shoe behind.

The Prince gives all of the women of the kingdom a chance to try on the glass slipper. Everyone is unsuccessful until Ella tries it on, and it fits her foot perfectly. Madame apologizes to Ella for her cruelty, and Ella forgives both her and Charlotte. Gabrielle and Jean-Michel's relationship is approved by Madame, and she welcomes her daughter back into her life. Jean-Michel is elected Prime-Minister, Topher and Ella wed, and they all live happily ever after (The Wedding: "There is Music in You").

Musical numbers
Unlike the three-act television version, the 2013 Broadway production is performed in two acts with additional songs, including "Me, Who Am I?", "Now Is the Time", "The Pursuit", "Loneliness of Evening" and "There's Music in You".

Act I
"Overture" – Orchestra
"Prologue" – Orchestra and Ella
"Me, Who Am I?" – Topher, Sebastian, Lord Pinkleton, Knights and Pages
"In My Own Little Corner" – Ella
"Now Is the Time" – Jean-Michel
"The Prince Is Giving a Ball" – Lord Pinkleton, Townspeople, Madame, Charlotte, Gabrielle, Ella and Marie
"Cinderella March" – Orchestra
"In My Own Little Corner" (reprise) / "Fol-De-Rol" – Ella and Marie
"Impossible/It's Possible" – Marie and Ella
"Gavotte" – Sebastian, Topher, Lord Pinkleton, Madame, Charlotte, Gabrielle and Lords & Ladies of the Court
"Ten Minutes Ago" – Topher and Ella
"Waltz for a Ball" – Orchestra
"Ten Minutes Ago" (reprise) – Topher, Ella and Lords & Ladies of the Court

 Act II
"Entr'acte" – Orchestra
"Stepsister's Lament" – Charlotte and Ladies of the Court
"The Pursuit" – Topher, Lord Pinkleton, Lords of the Court, Pages, Ella, the Footman and the Driver
"He Was Tall" – Ella
"When You're Driving Through the Moonlight" – Ella, Madame, Charlotte and Gabrielle
"A Lovely Night" – Ella, Madame, Charlotte and Gabrielle
"A Lovely Night" (reprise) – Ella and Gabrielle
"Loneliness of Evening" – Topher and Ella
"Announcing the Banquet" – Sebastian, Lord Pinkleton, Heralds and Madame
"There's Music in You" – Marie
"Now Is the Time" (reprise) – Jean-Michel and Gabrielle
"Do I Love You Because You're Beautiful?" – Topher and Ella
"The Shoe Fits" / "The Proposal" – Topher, Ella and Company
"Finale" – Marie and Company

Notable casts  

Notable Broadway replacements:
 For Ella: Carly Rae Jepsen and Keke Palmer
 For Madame: Fran Drescher, NeNe Leakes, Sherri Shepherd and Nancy Opel
 For Marie: Judy Kaye and Rebecca Luker

Reception
Ben Brantley of The New York Times called the production a "glittery patchwork of a show" that "wants to be reassuringly old-fashioned and refreshingly irreverent, sentimental and snarky, sincere and ironic, all at once." Brantley added that the show "doesn't seem to know quite what" it wants to be. The Financial Times praised the cast, especially Osnes, the costumes and the choreography and opined that "the production is an absolute joy, marred only by occasional slowness of pace."  Richard Zoglin, writing for Time magazine, noted that the new production is "brightly colored, high spirited and well sung", but comparing it with the "emotionally alive" 1957 broadcast, he found the original stepsisters to be "more credible and less cartoonish than their present-day equivalents" and thought that the Prince and Cinderella "make a dreamier pair – you actually can believe they are falling in love. ... The new Broadway version, for all its hip updating, is a much less adventurous project." A reviewer from the Chicago Tribune wrote: The fundamental problem with ... Beane's perplexing, wholly unromantic and mostly laugh-free new book ... – which turns the heroine into a social reformer ... the stepsisters ... into sympathetic, wounded creatures of thwarted desire, and Prince Charming ... into a myopic dunce who needs his eyes opened to the poverty of his people – is that it denies the audience the pleasure of instant reversals of fortune. ... This new version ends up collapsing the basic logic of the familiar story and tramples all over the musical soul of a score from another era. On the other hand, an Associated Press review praised Beane's script and wrote that it "crackles with sweetness and freshness, combining a little Monty Python's Spamalot with some Les Misérables. It also found the cast "first-rate" and the overall story "quirky, yet heart filled".  The reviewer from USA Today also liked the production, commenting: Osnes and a gifted supporting cast make this fairy tale very much their own – a scrumptious trifle that, for all its hokey moments, will charm theatergoers of all ages. Beane['s] Cinderella is not merely a kind maiden in distress, but a curious young woman becoming aware of injustices beyond her own shabby treatment. ... If the twist sounds a bit like a post-feminist contrivance, Beane keeps things sufficiently light and whimsical; the satire may verge on dopey at times, but it's never pretentious. And Brokaw elicits breezy, witty performances from his players, who could hardly be better suited to their roles. ... The visual effects are ... more dazzling than the score.

Cast album

An original Broadway cast recording of the production was issued by Ghostlight Records in 2013. The album features arrangements of the score by David Chase and was conducted by Andy Einhorn. Orchestrations are by Danny Troob.

Awards and nominations
The musical was nominated for nine Tony Awards, winning only one for William Ivey Long's costume design. It received five Drama Desk Award nominations, winning three, for Outstanding Orchestrations, Costume Design and, for Osnes, Outstanding Actress in a Musical. It was also nominated for two Drama League Awards but did not win either, and for eight Outer Critics Circle Awards, winning one for costume design.

Original Broadway production

References

External links 
Official Broadway production website

 (archive)
Cinderella at Broadwaymusicalhome.com
Cinderella at Rodgers & Hammerstein Theatricals

Musicals by Rodgers and Hammerstein
Works based on Cinderella
Musicals based on secular traditions
Musicals based on works by Charles Perrault
Broadway musicals
2013 musicals
Stage productions of plays
Plays based on fairy tales
Tony Award-winning musicals